The Lone Star Trail is a 1943 American Western film directed by Ray Taylor and starring Johnny Mack Brown and Tex Ritter.  The supporting cast features Fuzzy Knight and Jennifer Holt and, in a small role as a villain, Robert Mitchum (billed as "Bob Mitchum"). The screenplay was written by Oliver Drake from a story by Victor Halperin. It was the last of 29 B-westerns Brown starred in for Universal beginning in 1939.

Plot
A paroled convict (Johnny Mack Brown) returns to his home town to prove his innocence against the land-grabbing town elders who framed him for a stagecoach robbery. He's aided in his quest by his partner (Fuzzy Knight), girl friend (Jennifer Holt), and a new friend (Tex Ritter) who is a U.S. marshal traveling incognito.

Cast
 Johnny Mack Brown as Blaze Barker
 Tex Ritter as Fargo Steele
 Fuzzy Knight as Angus MacAngus
 Jennifer Holt as Joan Winters
 George Eldredge as Doug Ransom
 Michael Vallon as Jonathan Bentley
 Harry Strang	as Sheriff Waddell
 Earle Hodgins as Mayor Cyrus Jenkins
 Jack Ingram as Henchman Dan Jason
 Robert Mitchum as Ben Slocum (as Bob Mitchum)
 Ethan Laidlaw Steve Bannister
 Jimmy Wakely Trio as Musicians, Cowhands

See also
 List of American films of 1943

External links
 The Lone Star Trail in the Internet Movie Database

1943 films
American black-and-white films
1943 Western (genre) films
American Western (genre) films
Films directed by Ray Taylor
1940s English-language films
1940s American films